WFNC can refer to:

 WFNC (AM), a radio station at 640 AM licensed to Fayetteville, North Carolina
 WFNC-FM, a radio station at 102.3 FM licensed to Lumberton, North Carolina